Calommata is a genus of purseweb spiders first described by Hippolyte Lucas in 1837.

Species
 it contains sixteen species:
Calommata fulvipes (Lucas, 1835) (type) – Indonesia (Java, Sumatra)
Calommata hangzhica F. Li & Xu, 2022 – China
Calommata jinggangica F. Li & Xu, 2022 – China
Calommata megae Fourie, Haddad & Jocqué, 2011 – Zimbabwe
Calommata meridionalis Fourie, Haddad & Jocqué, 2011 – South Africa
Calommata namibica Fourie, Haddad & Jocqué, 2011 – Namibia
Calommata obesa Simon, 1886 – Thailand
Calommata pichoni Schenkel, 1963 – China
Calommata signata Karsch, 1879 – China, Korea, Japan
Calommata simoni Pocock, 1903 – West, Central, East Africa
Calommata sundaica (Doleschall, 1859) – Indonesia (Java, Sumatra), Israel
Calommata tamdaoensis Zha, Pham & Li, 2012 – Vietnam
Calommata tibialis Fourie, Haddad & Jocqué, 2011 – Ivory Coast, Togo
Calommata transvaalica (Hewitt, 1916) – South Africa
Calommata truculenta (Thorell, 1887) – Myanmar
Calommata yuanjiangica F. Li & Xu, 2022 – China

References

Atypidae
Mygalomorphae genera